Cisauk is a district located in the Tangerang Regency of Banten Province in Java, Indonesia. It covers an area of 27.77 km2 and had a population of 64,083 at the 2010 Census and 90,846 at the 2020 Census.

References

Tangerang Regency
Districts of Banten
Populated places in Banten